Alissar Abdel-Halim Caracalla is a Lebanese dance instructor, choreographer and art director. She is the founder and director of the Orientalist Dance Company and CDS, the Caracalla School of Dance, which is simply known as "Studio Caracalla: L'art de la Danse."
Caracalla is the daughter of Abdel-Halim Caracalla the founder of the Caracalla Dance Theatre.

Biography
Alissar Abdel-Halim Caracalla was born 1974 on February 26 in Lebanon.
Her father, Abdel-Halim Caracalla a Shiite Muslim from Baalbek, married her mother, a Christian from Zahle, in a church. She spent the duration of the Lebanese civil war growing up in London. 
At the age of 18, she moved to the United States.

Education
She received her BA in International Communications and Choreography from Loyola Marymount University in Los Angeles and her master's degree in Fine Arts in Dance Theory and Choreography at UCLA.

Career
In 2005, she choreographed the dance sequels in Philippe Aractingi's feature film, Bosta.
In 2011, she joined forces with Kunhadi to raise road safety awareness in Lebanon and became one of their four ambassadors for the Decade of Action for Road Safety 2011–2020 in Lebanon. Additionally, she was the dance instructor and choreographer in the highly popular, reality TV show, Star Academy.

Personal life
She lived in Los Angeles for several years. Currently, she lives in London and Beirut.
Caracalla is married to Nael Chehab an aerospace engineer and founder of the business PrivaSky. They had their wedding in Cyprus  in 2012.
She gave birth to their first child in 2017. Her main personal hobby is yoga. In addition to Lebanese Arabic, she is a fluent speaker of French and English.

Notes

Living people
Lebanese dancers
Lebanese emigrants to the United Kingdom
Lebanese choreographers
Contemporary dancers
Lebanese female dancers
Lebanese Shia Muslims
1974 births
Lebanese emigrants to the United States
Lebanese art directors